John Wheatley (8 January 1860 – 19 April 1962) was a New Zealand cricketer who played first-class cricket for Canterbury between 1882 and 1904.

Born in Australia, Wheatley moved to New Zealand when he was 16. A middle-order batsman who also bowled early in his career and occasionally kept wicket later in his career, Wheatley made his highest first-class score of 53 against the touring Queenslanders in 1896–97. In senior competition for his club, Christchurch, in 1879–80, Wheatley took 71 wickets at an average of 4.8.

For some years he was the sole Canterbury selector. He also coached in Christchurch. He died in 1962 at the age of 102 years 101 days, making him the longest-lived first-class cricketer at the time. As of 2021, he is the eighth-oldest.

See also
 Lists of oldest cricketers
 List of centenarians (sportspeople)

References

External links

1860 births
1962 deaths
Men centenarians
New Zealand centenarians
New Zealand cricketers
Canterbury cricketers
Sportsmen from New South Wales
Wicket-keepers